This page covers all relevant details regarding PFC Cherno More Varna for all official competitions inside the 2016–17 season. These are the Bulgarian First Professional League and Bulgarian Cup.  The team's head coach Nikola Spasov has signed a one-year contract extension immediately after the 2015–16 season, but left the club by mutual consent a few weeks later.  Subsequently, on 21 June 2016 the club appointed Georgi Ivanov as new head coach, which will be his second spell at the helm of Cherno More.

As the club's ground, Ticha Stadium, was not certified to host league games, the team will play all of its home games at Kavarna Stadium in Kavarna at least until the repair works at Ticha are completed.

Transfers

In

Out

Squad information

Competitions

Overall

Competition record

Minutes on the pitch
Includes injury time.  Positions indicate the most natural position of the particular player, followed by alternative positions where he actually started games during the course of the season.

Correct as of match played on 31 May 2017.

Goalscorers

Last updated: 31 May 2017

Clean sheets

Last updated: 5 April 2017

Own goals

Man of the Match performances 

Last updated: 31 May 2017
Source: Match reports in Competitions, Gong.bg Man of the Match Awards

Disciplinary record 
Correct as of 31 May 2017
Players are listed in descending order of 
Players with the same amount of cards are listed by their position on the club's official website

Suspensions served

Injuries
Players in bold are still out from their injuries.  Players listed will/have miss(ed) at least one competitive game (missing from whole match day squad).

Home attendances
Correct as of match played on 28 May 2017.

{| class="wikitable sortable" style="text-align:center; font-size:90%"
|-
!width=140 | Comp
!width=120 class="unsortable" | Date
!width=60 | Score
!width=250 class="unsortable" | Opponent
!width=150 | Attendance
|-
|First Professional League||8 August 2016 ||bgcolor="#CCFFCC"|1–0 ||Montana ||1,200
|-
|First Professional League||19 August 2016 ||bgcolor="#CCFFCC"|2–0 ||Lokomotiv Plovdiv ||1,050
|-
|First Professional League||9 September 2016 ||bgcolor="#FFCCCC"|1–3 ||Ludogorets Razgrad ||1,540
|-
|First Professional League||25 September 2016 ||bgcolor="#FFFFCC"|0–0 ||Slavia Sofia ||490
|-
|First Professional League||14 October 2016 ||bgcolor="#CCFFCC"|2–1 ||Vereya ||190
|-
|First Professional League||30 October 2016 ||bgcolor="#CCFFCC"|3–1 ||Neftochimic ||600
|-
|First Professional League||18 November 2016 ||bgcolor="#FFFFCC"|0–0 ||Pirin Blagoevgrad ||180
|-
|First Professional League||29 November 2016 ||bgcolor="#FFFFCC"|1–1 ||Lokomotiv Gorna Oryahovitsa ||70
|-
|First Professional League||11 December 2016 ||bgcolor="#CCFFCC"|1–0 ||Dunav Ruse ||220
|-
|First Professional League||19 February 2017 ||bgcolor="#FFCCCC"|0–2 ||CSKA Sofia ||2,550
|-
|First Professional League||2 March 2017 ||bgcolor="#CCFFCC"|1–0 ||Beroe ||220
|-
|First Professional League||11 March 2017 ||bgcolor="#FFFFCC"|1–1 ||Botev Plovdiv ||300
|-
|First Professional League||1 April 2017 ||bgcolor="#CCFFCC"|1–0 ||Levski Sofia ||2,510
|-
|First Professional League||23 April 2017 ||bgcolor="#CCFFCC"|3–2 ||Lokomotiv Plovdiv ||200
|-
|First Professional League||7 May 2017 ||bgcolor="#FFCCCC"|0–1 ||Levski Sofia ||1,100
|-
|First Professional League||13 May 2017 ||bgcolor="#FFCCCC"|0–1 ||CSKA Sofia ||1,700
|-
|First Professional League||17 May 2017 ||bgcolor="#FFCCCC"|1–2 ||Dunav Ruse ||240
|-
|First Professional League||28 May 2017 ||bgcolor="#FFCCCC"|1–3 ||Ludogorets Razgrad ||290
|-
|bgcolor="#C0C0C0"|
|bgcolor="#C0C0C0"|
|bgcolor="#C0C0C0"|
| Total attendance
|14,650
|-
|bgcolor="#C0C0C0"|
|bgcolor="#C0C0C0"|
|bgcolor="#C0C0C0"|
| Total league attendance
|14,650
|-
|bgcolor="#C0C0C0"|
|bgcolor="#C0C0C0"|
|bgcolor="#C0C0C0"|
| Average attendance
|814
|-
|bgcolor="#C0C0C0"|
|bgcolor="#C0C0C0"|
|bgcolor="#C0C0C0"|
| Average league attendance
|814

Club

Coaching staff
{|class="wikitable"
!Position
!Staff
|-
|-
|Manager|| Georgi Ivanov
|-
|Assistant First Team Coach|| Ivaylo Petrov
|-
|Assistant First Team Coach|| Emanuil Lukanov
|-
|Goalkeeper Coach|| Stoyan Stavrev
|-
|First Team Fitness Coach|| Veselin Markov
|-
|Individual Team Fitness Coach|| Viktor Bumbalov
|-
|Medical Director|| Dr. Petko Atev
|-

Other information

References

PFC Cherno More Varna seasons
Cherno More Varna